The Dündenhorn is a mountain of the Bernese Alps, overlooking Lake Oeschinen in the Bernese Oberland. It lies between the valleys of Kandersteg and Kiental, to the west of the Hohtürli Pass that links the two valleys.

References

External links
 Dündenhorn on Hikr

Mountains of the Alps
Mountains of Switzerland
Mountains of the canton of Bern
Two-thousanders of Switzerland